Martin de Vries ( or ) may refer to

 Martin de Vries (1589–1647), an explorer and cartographer for the Dutch East India Company
 Martin de Vries (b. 1960), a basketball player
 Martin de Vries (b. 1992), a soccer player